Granulina is a genus of minute sea snails, marine gastropod mollusks or micromollusks in the family Granulinidae.

Species
Species within the genus Granulina include:

Granulina africana Gofas, 1992
Granulina agger (Watson, 1886)
Granulina aidae Espinosa & Ortea, 2006
Granulina amianta Dall, 1889
Granulina anasantanae Ortea & Moro, 2019
 Granulina angeae Cossignani & Lorenz, 2020
Granulina antillensis Jong & Coomans, 1988
Granulina anxia Hedley, 1909
 Granulina atomella (Bavay, 1917)
 Granulina aubryi Cossignani & Lorenz, 2020
Granulina benitoi Espinosa & Ortea, 2014
Granulina boucheti Gofas, 1992
Granulina boyeri Bonfitto & Smriglio, 2019
Granulina calla McCleery, 2010
Granulina calypso Espinosa & Ortea, 2019
Granulina canariensis Boyer, 2001
Granulina cartagenaensis McCleery, 2010
Granulina cartwrighti Sowerby I, 1915
Granulina cerea Smeriglio, Gubbioli & Mariottini, 2000
 †Granulina clandestina (Brocchi, 1814)
Granulina clandestinella Bavay, 1908
Granulina colonensis McCleery, 2010
Granulina crassa Smeriglio, Gubbioli & Mariottini, 2000
Granulina crystallina Smeriglio, Gubbioli & Mariottini, 2000
Granulina cylindrata Boyer & Rolan, 2004
Granulina darienensis McCleery, 2010
 † Granulina detruncata La Perna, Landau & Marquet, 2001 
Granulina dianae Lussi & G. Smith, 2015
Granulina eideri Espinosa & Ortea, 2014
Granulina elliottae Cotton, 1944
Granulina elliptica La Perna, 2000 
Granulina falsijaponica Habe, 1957
Granulina fernandesi Boyer & Rolan, 1999
Granulina gayracaensis McCleery, 2010
Granulina ghanensis Rolan & Fernandes, 1997
Granulina globosa Wakefield & McCleery, 2004
Granulina gofasi Smriglio & Mariottini, 1996
Granulina granatensis McCleery, 2010
Granulina gradata Boyer, 2018
Granulina grata Thiele, 1925
Granulina guanajatabey Espinosa & Ortea, 2003
Granulina guancha (d'Orbigny, 1840)
Granulina gubbiolii (Smriglio & Mariottini, 1996)
Granulina guttula (La Perna, 1999)
Granulina hadria (Dall, 1889)
Granulina hedleyi Boyer, 2003
 † Granulina iberica La Perna, Landau & Marquet, 2001
Granulina iridisa McCleery, 2010
Granulina isseli Nevill & Nevill, 1875
 Granulina keilori Espinosa & Ortea, 2019
Granulina lagrifa Espinosa, Fernandez-Garcês & Ortea, 2004
Granulina lapernai Smriglio & Mariottini, 2013
Granulina lawsonae Lussi & Smith, 1998
Granulina lazaroi Espinosa & Ortea, 2006
Granulina liei Bozzetti, 2008
 † Granulina longa La Perna, Landau & Marquet, 2001
 Granulina luizae Ortea & Moro, 2020
 Granulina magagnai Espinosa & Ortea, 2019
 † Granulina malacitana La Perna, Landau & Marquet, 2001 
Granulina mamanucensis Wakefield & McCleery, 2004
Granulina margaritula Carpenter, 1857
Granulina marginata (Bivona, 1832)
Granulina mariei (Crosse, 1867)
Granulina mauretanica Gofas, 1992
Granulina mediterranea Landau, La Perna & Marquet, 2006
Granulina melitensis (Smriglio, Mariottini & Rufini, 1998)
Granulina minitica Espinosa & Ortea, 2019
Granulina minae Espinosa & Ortea, 2000
 Granulina minitica Espinosa & Ortea, 2019
Granulina minusculina (Locard, 1897)
Granulina molinai Espinosa & Ortea, 2006
Granulina monjesensis McCleery, 2010
Granulina morassii Bonfitto & Smriglio, 2019
Granulina nebulosa Boyer, 2018
Granulina nivalis McCleery, 2010
Granulina nofronii Smeriglio, Gubbioli & Mariottini, 2000
Granulina nympha Brazier, 1894
Granulina ocarina Fernandes, 1988
Granulina occulta (Monterosato, 1869)
Granulina ocella McCleery, 2010
Granulina oneili Espinosa & Ortea, 2014
Granulina opima (Laseron, 1957)
Granulina ovata McCleery, 2010
Granulina ovuliformis d'Orbigny 1841
Granulina parilis Gofas & Fernandes, 1988
Granulina perminima Sowerby III, 1894
Granulina philpoppei Cossignani, 2006
Granulina pierrepineaui Pin & Boyer, 1995
Granulina pinguisa McCleery, 2010
Granulina pirazzinii Cossignani & Lorenz, 2018
Granulina plagula McCleery, 2010
Granulina producera McCleery, 2010
Granulina pruinosa Boyer, 2003
Granulina pulvis Jousseaume, 1875
Granulina pruinosa Boyer, 2003
Granulina pusaterii Smriglio & Mariottini in Giannuzzi-Savelli et al., 2003
Granulina pyriformis (Carpenter, 1865)
Granulina rosea Boyer, 2018
Granulina rutae Ortea Rato, Abad & Barrios, 2008
Granulina scutulata Boyer, 2018
Granulina tantilla (Gould, 1860)
Granulina tenuilabiata La Perna, 1999
Granulina tinolia (Dall, 1927)
Granulina tobagoensis McCleery, 2010
Granulina torosa Gofas, 1992
Granulina truncata Dall, 1927
Granulina turbiniformis (Bavay, 1917)
Granulina vagger Watson, 1886
Granulina vanhareni (van Aartsen, M. & G., 1984)
Granulina velaensis McCleery, 2010
Granulina vitrea Laseron, 1957
Granulina volcana McCleery, 2010
Granulina waltergomezi McCleery, 2010

Species brought into synonymy
Granulina alfredensis (Bartsch, 1915): synonym of Plesiocystiscus alfredensis (Bartsch, 1915)
Granulina algoensis (E. A. Smith, 1901): synonym of Crithe algoensis (E. A. Smith, 1901)
Granulina aphanospira (Tomlin, 1913): synonym of Plesiocystiscus aphanospira (Tomlin, 1913)
Granulina atlantidea Boyer, 2016: synonym of Granulinopsis atlantidea (Boyer, 2016) (original combination)
Granulina bougei Bavay, 1917: synonym of Cystiscus bougei (Bavay, 1917)
Granulina guttula La Perna, 1999: synonym of Granulina mediterranea Landau, La Perna & Marquet, 2006
Granulina guttula (Sowerby I, 1832): synonym of Hydroginella guttula (Sowerby I, 1832)
Granulina horikosii Habe, 1951: synonym of Granulina tantilla (Gould, 1860)
Granulina microgonia (Dall, 1927): synonym of Cystiscus microgonia (Dall, 1927)
Granulina pseustes (E.A. Smith, 1904): synonym of Cystiscus pseustes (E.A. Smith, 1904)
Granulina thalia (Turton, 1932): synonym of Plesiocystiscus thalia (W. Turton, 1932)
Granulina zanclea Bogi, Boyer, Renda & Giacobbe, 2016 : synonym of Granulinopsis zanclea (Bogi, Boyer, Renda & Giacobbe, 2016) (original combination)

References

  1992.  Le genre Granulina (Marginellidae) en Méditerranée et dans l'Atlantique oriental. Bollettino Malacologico 28 (1-4): 1-26.
 Malacolog. The Academy of Natural Sciences
 Coovert G.A. & Coovert H.K. (1995) Revision of the supraspecific classification of marginelliform gastropods. The Nautilus 109(2-3): 43-110. page(s): 73
 Gofas, S.; Le Renard, J.; Bouchet, P. (2001). Mollusca, in: Costello, M.J. et al. (Ed.) (2001). European register of marine species: a check-list of the marine species in Europe and a bibliography of guides to their identification. Collection Patrimoines Naturels, 50: pp. 180–213

Granulinidae
Taxonomy articles created by Polbot